Berlin Brothersvalley High School is a small Public High School, located in the central Somerset County town of Berlin. The High School is connected to the Middle School and Elementary School.

Curriculum
BBHS has curriculum in the following subjects and areas of study
 Agriculture Education
 Computer Education
 Family and Consumer Sciences
 English
 Fine Arts - Including Mountaineers in Motion Community Service Class
 Health
 Language - French and Spanish
 Mathematics
 Physical Education
 Technology Education
 Science
 Social Studies

Vocational education
Students in grades 10-12, who wish to pursue training in a specific career path or field may attend the Somerset County Technology Center in Somerset Township.

Graduation requirements
According to the course catalog, Students must meet the following credits to graduate from BBHS.

Students planning to attend a four-year post-secondary institution must take 4 credits of math and science courses.

Sports teams 

The school mascot for all three schools is the Mountaineer, and the school colors are royal blue and white. BBHS participates in PIAA District V. Berlin Brothersvalley High School has a cooperative sports agreement with Shanksville-Stonycreek School District to offer wrestling and soccer.

References

Public high schools in Pennsylvania
Schools in Somerset County, Pennsylvania